The Minister of Defence of Hungary is a member of the Hungarian cabinet and the head of the Ministry of Defence. The defence minister appoints the Commander of the Hungarian Defence Forces. The current minister is Kristóf Szalay-Bobrovniczky.

The position was called People's Commissar of War during the Hungarian Soviet Republic in 1919 and Minister of War during two short periods of Hungarian history: at the time of the Hungarian Revolution of 1848 and during a very short chaotic term (less than two years) after World War I, when three political transformations took place.

This page is a list of Ministers of Defence of Hungary.

Ministers of War (1848–1849)

Hungarian Kingdom (1848–1849)
Parties

Hungarian State (1849)
Parties

After the collapse of the Hungarian Revolution of 1848, the Hungarian Kingdom became an integral part of the Austrian Empire until 1867, when dual Austro-Hungarian Monarchy was created.

Ministers of Defence (1867–1918)
From 1867 to 1918 there was a Honvédministerium responsible for the military of the Hungarian half of Austria-Hungary and a Ministry of Defence for the military of the Austrian half, along with a Ministry of War with responsibility for Austria-Hungary as a whole.

Hungarian Kingdom (1867–1918)
Parties

Ministers of War (1918–1919)

Hungarian Kingdom (1918)
Parties

Hungarian People's Republic (1918–1919)
Parties

People's Commissars of War (1919)

Hungarian Soviet Republic (1919)
Parties

Counter-revolutionary governments (1919)
Parties

Ministers of War (1919–1920)

Hungarian People's Republic (1919)
Parties

Hungarian Republic (1919–1920)
Parties

Ministers of Defence (1920–present)

Hungarian Kingdom (1920–1946)
Parties

Government of National Unity (1944–1945)
Parties

Soviet-backed provisional governments (1944–1946)
Parties

Hungarian Republic (1946–1949)
Parties

Hungarian People's Republic (1949–1989)
Parties

Hungarian Republic / Hungary (1989–present)
Parties

See also
List of heads of state of Hungary
List of prime ministers of Hungary
List of Ministers of Agriculture of Hungary
List of Ministers of Civilian Intelligence Services of Hungary
List of Ministers of Croatian Affairs of Hungary
List of Ministers of Education of Hungary
List of Ministers of Finance of Hungary
List of Ministers of Foreign Affairs of Hungary
List of Ministers of Interior of Hungary
List of Ministers of Justice of Hungary
List of Ministers of Public Works and Transport of Hungary
Politics of Hungary

References

Hungary
Defence Ministers
 
Military of Hungary
Hungary